Tye'sha Nicole Fluker (born December 27, 1984) is an American professional basketball player in the WNBA.

High school
Fluker played for Muir  High School in Pasadena, California, where she was named a WBCA All-American. She participated in the 2002 WBCA High School All-America Game where she scored three points. She also participated in the 2002 Inaugural Women's McDonald All-American Game

College
Fluker attended college at the University of Tennessee and graduated in 2006. There she helped lead the Lady Vols to three Final Four appearances, two regular season SEC titles, two SEC Tournament crowns and an overall record of 125–19 in her four-year career. Following her collegiate career, she was selected 10th overall in the 2006 WNBA Draft by the Charlotte Sting.

Tennessee statistics
Source

Professional
On January 8, 2007, she was traded to the Seattle Storm as the seventh pick in the WNBA Dispersal Draft of former Charlotte Sting players.

On June 5, 2008, she signed with the Chicago Sky.

She played for Ružomberok in Slovakia during the 2008–09 WNBA off-season.

She is playing in Poland for the winter of 2010 in Energa Toruń.

Notes

External links
WNBA Player Profile

1984 births
Living people
American women's basketball players
American expatriate basketball people in Poland
American expatriate basketball people in Slovakia
Basketball players from Pasadena, California
Centers (basketball)
Charlotte Sting players
Chicago Sky players
Los Angeles Sparks players
McDonald's High School All-Americans
Seattle Storm players
Tennessee Lady Volunteers basketball players